Nawab Sir Muhammad Faiz Ali Khan Bahadur, KCSI (26 August 1821 – 5 August 1894) was the Nawab of Pahasu, also a politician and administrator, who served as Prime Minister of Jaipur State.

Early life
Nawab Sir Muhammad Faiz Ali Khan Khan KCSI, was scion of Muslim Rajput community of Lalkhani (Badgujar Rajput) lineage. He was born to Murad Ali Khan.

Relations with British
He and his father both served in Jaipur Armed Forces and served British well in Indian Mutiny of 1857. He was rewarded for his loyalty with a large estate and title of Khan Bahadur.

Prime Minister of Jaipur State
He served as Prime Minister of Jaipur State in 1863 during reign of Sawai Ram Singh II and was also given a jagir in Jaipur State for his services.

Positions
He was an active member in public life and was:
 Member of Legislative council of United Provinces
 Member of Governors General's  Legislative council

Honours
1871: Companion of the Order of the Star of India and later elevated to
1876: Knight Commander of the Order of the Star of India.
He was also given titles of Khan Badaur and Mumtaz-ud-Daula.

Estate
He was jagirdar of Pahasu with title of Nawab of Pahasu. Also held jagir in Jaipur State located at Tazami. He also held one village in Sadabad Estate.

Successor
He was succeeded by his able son Sir Muhammad Faiyaz Ali Khan, as Nawab of Pahasu.

References

1821 births
1894 deaths
Knights Commander of the Order of the Star of India
People from Bulandshahr
Indian Muslims
Indian royalty
Administrators in the princely states of India
Indian knights